Cucurbita okeechobeensis, the Okeechobee gourd, is a species of gourd in the family Cucurbitaceae, native to Mexico and the United States. There are two subspecies; one is endemic to Florida, primarily in the region around Lake Okeechobee, the other to the State of Veracruz in eastern Mexico. Once abundant, it has state and federal listing as an endangered species.
One of its peculiarities is the yellow corolla not so common in other Cucurbita species.

Description
A climbing vine, C. okeechobeensis leaves have irregular serrate margins with 5 to 7 angular, shallow lobes. Overall the leaf blades are heart or kidney-shaped. Young leaves are covered with downy hair. The bell-shaped flowers are cream-colored, with long corollas (6 to 7cm).

Taxonomy
The taxonomy of the species and subspecies is uncertain. It was formerly classified as Pepo okeechobeensis.

Some authorities divide it into two subspecies:

Cucurbita okeechobeensis subsp. martinezii — Martinez gourd, - State of Veracruz in Mexico
Cucurbita okeechobeensis subsp. okeechobeensis — Okeechobee gourd - State of Florida in United States

Ecology
It was often found growing on abandoned alligator nests in pond apple (Annona glabra) groves near Lake Okeechobee.

References

External links
University of South Florida Atlas of Florida Vascular Plants — species account and distribution
Center for Plant Conservation

okeechobeensis
Flora of Florida
Flora of Veracruz
Squashes and pumpkins
Vines
Plants described in 1930
Endangered biota of Mexico
Endangered flora of the United States